Sergei Nikolayevich Yuminov (born 27 June 1970) is a former Russian professional footballer.

Club career
He made his professional debut in the Russian Second Division in 1992 for FC Energiya Chaykovsky. He played 4 games and scored 2 goals in the UEFA Intertoto Cup 1998 with FC Shinnik Yaroslavl.

References

1970 births
Sportspeople from Izhevsk
Living people
Russian footballers
FC Shinnik Yaroslavl players
Russian Premier League players
FC Fakel Voronezh players
FC Sokol Saratov players
FC Elista players
Association football forwards
FC Izhevsk players